Disentis/Mustér railway station is the eastern terminus of the Matterhorn Gotthard Bahn line from Brig via Andermatt, and the western terminus of the Rhaetian Railway line from Landquart via Chur and Reichenau-Tamins. The station is located on the south bank of the river in the village and municipality of Disentis/Mustér, in the Swiss canton of Graubünden.

Layout
The station has three platform tracks, served by a side platform and an island platform, which are situated beneath an overall canopy. The station building is on the northern side of the line and gives direct access to the side platform, whilst the island platform is accessed through a pedestrian subway. To the south of the island platform there are several additional through tracks, and there are sidings on both sides of the station.

Services
These two services connect in Disentis/Mustér.

Gallery

References

External links
 
 Matterhorn Gotthard Bahn
 
 

Matterhorn Gotthard Bahn stations
Railway stations in Graubünden
Rhaetian Railway stations
Disentis